Zyginopsis is a genus of true bugs belonging to the family Cicadellidae (leafhoppers). The genus was first described by Ramakrishnan & Menon in 1973.

Species 
Species of the genus Zyginopsis include:
Zyginopsis horizontalis 
Zyginopsis major 
Zyginopsis verticalis

See also 
List of hemipterans of Sri Lanka

References 

Cicadellidae genera
Erythroneurini